Dakshin Dinajpur University is a public state university in Balurghat, Dakshin Dinajpur district, West Bengal. The university was established in 2018. The university is located in Mahinagar, Balurghat.

History
The Dakshin Dinajpur University Act, 2018 was passed in the West Bengal Legislative Assembly on 31 July 2018. After this, the West Bengal government started establishment of the university and construction of the Campus.

Prof. Sanchari Roy Mukherjee joined Dakshin Dinajpur University on  December 15, 2020, as first Vice Chancellor.

In July 2021 Vice Chancellor of university said in press that Dakshin Dinajpur University will start its first session for the students from October 2021.

Campus
Dakshin Dinajpur University has only one campus. The campus is located at Mahinagar, Balurghat.

See also
 List of universities in West Bengal
 Education in West Bengal

References

Universities and colleges in Dakshin Dinajpur district